Tavoularis, Ταβουλάρη is a Greek surname. Notable people with the surname include:

Dean Tavoularis (born 1932), Greek American motion picture production designer
Sophia Tavoularis (1843–1916), Greek stage actor
Stavros Tavoularis, Canadian physicist

Greek-language surnames